Naama may refer to:

NAAMA, the National Arab American Medical Association
Naâma, municipality in Algeria, capital of Naâma Province
Naâma Province in Algeria
Naama Bay, resort town in Egypt, just north of Sharm El Sheikh
Nāma, Pali and Sanskrit for "name"
Naamam, the identification mark of South Indian Vaishnavites
Naama (singer), Tunisian singer
Naama, Bong County, Liberia
Naama, a composition by Iannis Xenakis

See also
Naamah (disambiguation)